Nissarana Vanaya (Sinhala: නිස්සරණ වනය) is a renowned meditation monastery in Sri Lanka. It is located in Mitirigala in the Western province close to the town of Kirindiwela.

History

Meetirigala Nissarana Vanaya is a monastery in the Kalyāṇi Yogāsrama Samsthava or Galduwa Samsthava, the strictest forest tradition in Sri Lanka. It is considered as one of Sri Lanka's most respected meditation monasteries and was founded in 1967 by Asoka Weeraratna (the founder of the German Dharmaduta Society and the Berlin Buddhist Vihara in Germany). He equipped the monastery with all the facilities conducive to the meditative life, found an accomplished meditation master, Ven. Matara Sri Nanarama Mahathera (author of 'Seven stages of Purification' and 'Seven Contemplations', both published by the BPS), to direct the meditation training, and then, his mission accomplished, he himself entered the Buddhist order under the name Mitirigala Dhammanisanthi. He died on July 2, 1999 after spending 27 years as a forest monk at Mitirigala. Ven. Dhammanisanthi was 80 years of age at the time of his death.

The distinguished senior monk Venerable Matara Sri Nanarama Mahathera was the first abbot and the meditation master. During his period Nissarana Vanaya became one of the most respected meditation monasteries of Sri Lanka due to the fame of its meditation master as well as its secluded and contemplative life where monks practiced sincerely with the aspiration of attaining Nibbana in this very life. Many foreign monks and lay people also practiced meditation under the guidance of Venerable Matara Sri Nanarama Mahathera. Due to his enormous influence on the revival and study of meditation techniques Ven. Nanarama was appointed as the head meditation master of a chain of forest monastery throughout the island called Kalyāṇi Yogāsrama Samsthava or Galduwa Samsthava. One of Ven. Nanarama's greatest gifts was his ability to incorporate the Burmese Vipassana techniques into Sri Lankan meditation traditions and balance them with the teaching of samatha meditation. It is here that the famous Buddhist nun Ayya Khema was taught by Ven. Ñāṇanārāma in the practice of the jhāna or samatha meditation.

On his passing away in 1992 a senior pupil, Venerable Panaduwa Khemananda became the new abbot and meditation teacher and served the monastery for 15 years. During this time one of the closest pupils of Ven. Nanarama, Ven. Katukurunde Nanananda Thera (famous for his books 'Concept and Reality', 'Nibbana-The Mind Stilled' and his series of 33 sermons on Nibbana) left the monastery due to its shifting away from the meditation training established by Ven. Ñāṇārāma.

Ven. Nanananda moved to Potgulgala Aranya near Devalegama, Kegalla where he is still residing, but until a few years ago was connected with the Mangalarama at Meetirigala; see below. Nissarana Vanaya moved closer to current Burmese Vipassana teachings. After Ven. Panaduwa Khemananda thero died in July 2006 the new most senior meditation teacher became Venerable Uda-Iriyagama Dhammajeewa Thera. Ven. Dhammajeewa (or Dhammajiva) is fluent in English and Burmese and has translated several meditation guides and books from Burmese into English and Sinhalese. Apart from the years of training under Ven. Matara Sri Nanananda he spent several years of training under Sayadaw U Panditabhiwansa in Myanmar (Burma), a well-known teacher in the Mahasi Sayadaw tradition.

Life at the monastery

The monks are dedicated to meditation practice and stay in solitary huts in the forest. Lay meditators stay in rooms in compounds. The monks and lay meditators regularly receive instructions from Ven. Dhammajiva, who regularly holds retreats for lay meditators at Nissarana Vanaya. Meditation is done in a large meditation hall in the centre of the monastery. Most monks meditate alone in their huts in the forest.

In the morning monks go on alms begging to a kitchen area down the hill where lay-people who have cooked food donate it to them. A few monks go begging in the traditional style to the village. The monks don't eat after mid-day.

In the evening there is a worship of the Bodhi Tree and Buddha followed by Pali chanting.

The monastery is located in a dense low-country tropical jungle and the climate tends to be hot and humid.

Male meditators are allowed to stay after requesting permission and receiving prior invitation. Retreats are held for female meditators at the reception area down the hill.

Other meditation monasteries at Meetirigala
Meetirigala (sometimes written Mithrigala or Meethirigala) is also the location of two other monasteries. One is the Dharmayatana a place for Tipitaka studies which was later turned into a Vipassana meditation facility for monks to follow Venerable Pa Auk Sayadaw's system of instructions. This place is also part of the Kalyāṇi Yogāsrama Samsthava tradition.'

In the third monastery in Mitirigala, called Mangalarama, there is the practice of a  meditation system propagated by the layman Mangala Upasaka and a female medium who claims to receive instructions from the late Nanarama Thera (now residing in the Brahma god realm). An Austrian monk is the abbot of the monastery. For some years this place was connected to Ven. Katukurunde Nanananda Thera and his disciples. There is also a meditation center for nuns and lay-women associated with Mangalarama closer to the village.

The Mangalarama is not connected to Nissarana Vanaya and the Dharmayatana.

See also 
 Katukurunde Nyanananda Thera
 Sri Kalyani Yogasrama Samstha
 Na Uyana Aranya

References
Nissarana Vanaya - Official website
Mitirigala Dhammavasa Maha Thero: The Third Abbot of Nissarana Vanaya (Sinhala Wikipedia) මීතිරිගල ධම්මාවාස මහ තෙරුන් වහන්සේ
The founding father of the Mitirigala Nissarana Vanaya:Life sketch of Asoka Weeraratna
Asoka Weeraratna - Official website 
Asoka Weeraratna - Wikipedia
Nissarana Vanaya monastery
Dhamma Talks From Meethirigala Nissarana Wanaya
Nissarana Wanaya
Meethirigala Forest Hermitage marks 40th Anniversary  
Bhikkhu Bodhi about Nissarana Vanaya in an interview
Retreat Information
 Meetirigala, the Forest for escaping from repeated birth - Information Brochure issued by the Meetirigala Nissarana Vanaya Sanrakshana Mandalaya

Buddhist meditation
Theravada Buddhist temples
Theravada Buddhist monasteries
Buddhist monasteries in Sri Lanka